Addison Hehr (October 27, 1909 – February 28, 1971) was an American art director. He was nominated for two Academy Awards in the category Best Art Direction.

Selected filmography
 The Day the Earth Stood Still (1951)
 The True Story of Jesse James (1957)
 Cimarron (1960)
 How the West Was Won (1962)
 The Scorpio Letters (1967)

References

External links

1909 births
1971 deaths
American art directors
People from Greene County, Ohio
People from Cleveland